Barovo is a village in the municipality of Sopište, North Macedonia.

Demographics
According to the 1467-68 Ottoman defter, Barovo appears as being inhabited by an Orthodox Albanian population. Some families had a mixed Slav-Albanian anthroponomy - usually a Slavic first name and an Albanian last name or last names with Albanian patronyms and Slavic suffixes. 

The names are: Staj-ko the son of Rusha, Stepan the son of Stajko, Niko the son of Dimitri, Vlado the son of Lazor, Doba the son of Rush, Stepan the son of Krydosa (Kry- Dosac), Minço his brother, Daba son of Persuka (Petr Suka), Damjan son of Vaso. 
 
According to the 2002 census, the village had a total of 23 inhabitants. Ethnic groups in the village include:

Albanians 13
Macedonians 9
Serbs 1

References

Villages in Sopište Municipality
Albanian communities in North Macedonia